Paige Mackenzie (born February 8, 1983) is an American professional golfer who played on the LPGA Tour.

Early years
Born and raised in Yakima, Washington, Mackenzie is a 2001 graduate of Eisenhower High School, where she was selected as a first-team All-Big-9 selection all four seasons. She was named the 2000 Girl Golfer of the Year for both the Washington Junior Golf Association and the Pacific Northwest Golf Association. By the time she graduated from high school, Mackenzie had posted five top-10 finishes in national tournaments, claiming one championship.

Collegiate career
Mackenzie continued her successful amateur career at the University of Washington in Seattle, where she graduated in 2006 with a bachelor's degree in business.  She recorded 22 top-10 finishes during her collegiate career, placing her first on the Huskies' all-time list. Among her numerous amateur awards and achievements, Mackenzie was T13 at the 2005 U.S. Women's Open, was named the 2005 Pacific Northwest Golf Association's Women's Player of the Year, and won both the match play and stroke play competitions of the 2005 Trans National Championship. Mackenzie was the 2006 Pac-10 and NCAA West Regional champion and finished her senior year ranked as the No. 1 amateur in the nation by Golfweek.

In the summer following graduation, Mackenzie lead the U.S. to 11½–6½ victory at the 2006 Curtis Cup at Bandon Dunes in southern Oregon, posting a 3-0-1 record with victories in both of her singles matches. A week later in northern Oregon, she was the medalist in the stroke play portion of the U.S. Women's Amateur at Pumpkin Ridge. Her last event as an amateur was at an LPGA Tour event, the Safeway Classic in Portland, where she tied for 45th place.

Professional career
Mackenzie turned professional in late August 2006 and played two LPGA Tour events on sponsors' exemptions. She competed on the Cactus Tour in Arizona that fall and qualified for the 2007 Duramed Futures Tour, and then won exempt status for the 2007 LPGA Tour season with a T12 finish at the LPGA Final Qualifying Tournament in December 2006.

She carded three Top-25 finishes in her 2008 campaign, including a 23rd-place finish at the Corona Morelia Championship, a 22nd at the P&G Beauty NW Arkansas Championship and a T24 finish at the Safeway Classic. Mackenzie started 2008 by winning the Sharp Open on the Cactus Tour.

In April 2012, the National Association of Professional Women announced its partnership with Paige Mackenzie who become "NAPW Athletic Spokeswoman". Paige also starred a nationwide television ad campaign for that professional association during 2012.

Results in LPGA majors

^ The Evian Championship was added as a major in 2013.

CUT = missed the half-way cut
"T" = tied

Summary

Most consecutive cuts made – 4 (2012 U.S. Open - 2013 Evian)
Longest streak of top-10s – 0

LPGA Tour career summary

1  Mackenzie's first three of the five LPGA Tour events played in 2006 were as an amateur
official through 2015 season

Team appearances
Amateur
Curtis Cup (representing the United States): 2006 (winners)

References

External links

American female golfers
LPGA Tour golfers
Golfers from Washington (state)
University of Washington Foster School of Business alumni
Sportspeople from Yakima, Washington
1983 births
Living people
21st-century American women